The Diary of Evelyn Lau is a 1994 Canadian television film directed by Sturla Gunnarsson and starring Sandra Oh as Evelyn Lau, a teenager who runs away from home and becomes a drug-addicted prostitute, later writing a book about her experiences. The film was shot in Vancouver, British Columbia. The film is based on Runaway: Diary of a Street Kid, a novel by Evelyn Lau.

Cast

References

1994 television films
1994 films
English-language Canadian films
1990s biographical films
Films about prostitution in Canada
Films shot in Vancouver
Films set in Vancouver
Canadian drama television films
1990s teen films
Canadian biographical drama films
1990s Canadian films